In applied mathematics, antieigenvalue theory was developed by Karl Gustafson from 1966 to 1968. The theory is applicable to numerical analysis, wavelets, statistics, quantum mechanics, finance and optimization.

The antieigenvectors  are the vectors most turned by a matrix or operator , that is to say those for which the angle between the original vector and its transformed image is greatest. The corresponding antieigenvalue  is the cosine of the maximal turning angle. Just like the eigenvalues which may be ordered as a spectrum from smallest to largest, the theory of antieigenvalues orders the antieigenvalues of an operator A from the smallest to the largest turning angles.

References

 .

Operator theory
Matrix theory